Neobarrettia victoriae, the lesser arid-land katydid, is a species of spiny predatory katydid in the family Tettigoniidae. It is found in Central America and North America.

References

 Capinera J.L, Scott R.D., Walker T.J. (2004). Field Guide to Grasshoppers, Katydids, and Crickets of the United States. Cornell University Press.
 Otte, Daniel (1997). "Tettigonioidea". Orthoptera Species File 7, 373.

Further reading

 

Neobarrettia
Insects described in 1907